Lough Bofin, the name of a lake in Ireland, may refer to:
 Lough Bofin (Galway), a lake in the Connemara region of County Galway
 Lough Bofin (River Shannon), a lake on the River Shannon, on the border of Counties Roscommon and Leitrim